Junge Kantorei is a choir established in 1968 by Joachim Carlos Martini. The choir is noted for its performances of Handel's works. It is based in Frankfurt, Heidelberg, and Marburg and has released a number of recordings. Among them are the first-time recordings of pasticci Gideon, Nabal und Tobit. Since 2014, Jonathan Hofmann is acting as the conductor of the choir.

References

1968 establishments in Germany
German choirs
Musical groups established in 1968